The Seguros Bolívar Open Pereira is a professional tennis tournament played on outdoor red clay courts. It is currently part of the Association of Tennis Professionals (ATP) Challenger Tour. It is held annually in Pereira, Colombia, since 2009.

Past finals

Singles

Doubles

External links
Official website of Seguros Bolívar Tennis
ITF search

 
ATP Challenger Tour
Clay court tennis tournaments
Tennis tournaments in Colombia